You Bright and Risen Angels is a 1987 novel by William T. Vollmann, detailing a fictional war between insects and the forces of modern civilization.  Vollmann described the book, his first, as "an allegory in part", inspired by his experiences with the mujahedeen in Afghanistan. The novel is subtitled "A Cartoon."  It is illustrated by the author.

Writing and composition
Vollman did not have a literary agent when he submitted the manuscript of the book to publishers. Vollman has said he used a "'writing by-the-yard' approach" to the novel and that it could have been "ten thousand pages longer".

Reception

Critical reception
The novel received positive reviews from the New York Times, Publishers Weekly, and elsewhere when published. Kirkus Reviews published a less positive review, comparing the book unfavorably to the work of Thomas Pynchon.

Honors
You Bright and Risen Angels won the 1988 Whiting Writers' Award.

References

1987 American novels
Postmodern novels
Fiction about insects
Works by William T. Vollmann
1987 debut novels
André Deutsch books
Atheneum Books books